Northcote Road Antique Market is a large indoor market located at 155a Northcote Road, Battersea in London, England. It houses over thirty dealers selling antiques, vintage, retro, and collectables.

The shop opened in 1986. In 2009, it was listed as one of the best 50 markets to visit by The Independent.

References

External links
 Official website
 See Inside.

Buildings and structures in the London Borough of Wandsworth
Art Deco architecture in London
Tourist attractions in the London Borough of Wandsworth
Retail markets in London